Backa is a locality situated in Kungsbacka Municipality, Halland County, Sweden, with 1,547 inhabitants in 2010.

References 

Populated places in Kungsbacka Municipality